Afromyia is a genus of flies belonging to the family Lesser Dung flies.

Species
A. flavimana Papp, 1978
A. ghanensis Papp, 1978
A. jeanneli (Richards, 1938)
A. longipes (Richards, 1951)
A. ruandana (Vanschuytbroeck, 1948)
A. wittei (Vanschuytbroeck, 1948)

References

Sphaeroceridae
Diptera of Africa
Schizophora genera